Noor Wali (born 28 August 1996) is a Pakistani cricketer. He made his first-class debut for Port Qasim Authority on 30 November 2015 in the 2015–16 Quaid-e-Azam Trophy.

References

External links
 

1996 births
Living people
Pakistani cricketers
Port Qasim Authority cricketers
Quetta Gladiators cricketers
Cricketers from Karachi